SAS Umkhonto (S98), formerly SAS Emily Hobhouse, was the second of three French-built s ordered by the South African Navy in 1968. Laid down in December 1968 and launched on 24 October 1969 and commissioned into the South African Navy under the command of Lt Cdr Lambert Jackson "Woody" Woodburne on 26 February 1971. The submarine was decommissioned in 2003 and scrapped in 2008.

Ship name
The first ships of the class in the French Navy were named after women, and the South African Navy followed this tradition. The submarine was christened SAS Emily Hobhouse after Emily Hobhouse, the British humanitarian and philanthropist who exposed the atrocious conditions into which some British concentration camps imprisoning the non-combatant Afrikaner population had deteriorated during the Boer War in South Africa.

Beginning in 1994, with the end of apartheid in South Africa, ships bearing names of noted European South African figures were renamed, and the vessel became SAS Umkhonto. Umkhonto is the Zulu word for spear.

Operational history
In 1972, SAS Emily Hobhouse, under the command of Lt Cdr Lambert Jackson Woodburne, landed Special Forces troops, led by Commandant Jan Breytenbach near Dar es Salaam. The Special Forces team placed explosives on a bridge, next to power lines and other targets around town. While making the pickup rendezvous, the submarine snagged a fishing net and sank the fishing vessel dragging the net.

Her mission was to pass through the security screen provided by the frigates  and SAS President Pretorius and simulate an attack on the replenishment ship, which the frigates were protecting. The heavy seas were causing clutter on the radar screens and the execution of a World War II-era convoy maneuver in the rough seas ended in a collision at 4:23am between Tafelberg and President Kruger which resulted in minor damage to Tafelberg and the sinking of President Kruger on the morning of 18 February with a loss of 16 lives. SAS Umkhonto was paid off in 2003 and scrapped in 2008.

References

Submarines of the South African Navy
Ships built in France
1969 ships
Daphné-class submarines of the South African Navy